Nineveh Township may refer to the following townships in the United States:
Nineveh Township, Johnson County, Indiana
Nineveh Township, Adair County, Missouri
Nineveh Township, Lincoln County, Missouri